Triplophysa crassilabris is a species of stone loach in the genus Triplophysa. It is endemic to China and was first described from the Xiaman Lake, Sichuan.

References

C
Freshwater fish of China
Endemic fauna of China
Taxa named by Ding Rui-Hua
Fish described in 1994